The 1954 European Figure Skating Championships were held in Bolzano, Italy from January 28 to 31. Elite senior-level figure skaters from European ISU member nations competed for the title of European Champion in the disciplines of men's singles, ladies' singles, pair skating, and ice dancing.

Results

Men

Ladies

Pairs

Ice dancing

References

External links
 results

European Figure Skating Championships, 1954
European Figure Skating Championships, 1954
European Figure Skating Championships
International figure skating competitions hosted by Italy
Sport in Bolzano
European Figure Skating Championships